Countess Sophie Marie von Voß (1729-1814) was a German lady in waiting and memoirist. She was the influential confidant and Oberhofmeisterin (mistress of the Robes) for many decades at the Prussian royal court. Her memoirs have also been published.

Early life 
Sophie Marie was the only daughter of Wolf Adolf von Pannwitz (1679–1750) and his wife, Johanna Maria Auguste von Jasmund (1702-1771). She had an older brother, Friedrich Wilhelm von Pannwitz (1719-1790), Knight Commander of the Order of Saint John.

Biography 
From 1743 until 1751, she served as maid of honor to Queen Sophia Dorothea. Prince Augustus Ferdinand of Prussia fell in love with her, and to discontinue what could have developed into a socially unacceptable affair, and end the difficult situation created when the prince reacted with jealous fits, she was married to her cousin, Count Johann Ernst von Voss (1726-1793), in 1751.

From 1763 until 1793, her spouse had the office of chamberlain of the household of Queen Elisabeth Christine at Schönhausen Palace, which meant that she often attended court. In 1787, the crown prince committed bigamy with the daughter of her brother-in-law, Julie von Voss.

After the death of her spouse in 1793, she temporarily retired to her estates in Mecklenburg. From 1793 until 1810, she served as mistress of the robes to the new crown princess, Louise of Mecklenburg-Strelitz. She accompanied the Prussian royal family to East Prussia during the invasion of Napoleon in 1806 to 1807. After Queen Louise's death, king Frederick William III relied upon Voß's company. With Voß's help, Prince Wilhelm zu Sayn-Wittgenstein-Hohenstein was introduced to the king's circle. 

In 1811, after the death of Queen Louise, she returned to her residence in Berlin. She died in Berlin in 1814.

References

 Sophie Marie Gräfin von Voss: Neunundsechzig Jahre am Preußischen Hofe. Aus den Erinnerungen. Aus dem Französischen übersetzt. Duncker & Humblot, Berlin 1876 (Digitalisat; 5. Auflage 1887: Digitalisat); Neuausgabe nach der Textgestalt der 5. Auflage 1887: Berlin Story Verlag, Berlin, 3. Auflage 2005,

External links 

 

1729 births
1814 deaths
German ladies-in-waiting
German memoirists
Women memoirists
Governesses to the Prussian court
Voss family